The Corkish Apartments is a building complex located in southwest Portland, Oregon listed on the National Register of Historic Places.

Further reading

See also
 National Register of Historic Places listings in Southwest Portland, Oregon

References

1890 establishments in Oregon
Individually listed contributing properties to historic districts on the National Register in Oregon
Queen Anne architecture in Oregon
Residential buildings completed in 1890
Apartment buildings on the National Register of Historic Places in Portland, Oregon
Southwest Portland, Oregon